Salvatore J. Turco is an American molecular and cellular biochemist, currently the Antonio S. Turco Endowed professor at University of Kentucky. Turco is also a published author.

References

Year of birth missing (living people)
Living people
American biochemists
University of Kentucky faculty
Indiana University alumni
University of Pittsburgh alumni